Ryo Takeuchi (born 23 October 1978), also known as "Uncle Liang" to his followers and fans in China, is a Japanese filmmaker best known for his documentaries about China's efforts in combating the coronavirus, including Long Time No See, Wuhan and China's Post-Pandemic Era: Winning Against All Odds.

Biography
Ryo Takeuchi was born in Abiko, Chiba, Japan on 23 October 1978. After graduating from high school, he learned to make films at specialized schools. He used to work for NHK. Ryo Takeuchi's connections with China began in 2002, when he was in Shanghai, Zhejiang and Jiangsu shooting a documentary about mahjong. Over the years, he has traveled frequently between China and Japan to make films.

In August 2013, he emigrated to China with his wife Zhao Ping. He pursued advanced studies at Nanjing University. In 2014, he founded the Hezhimeng Culture Communication Co., Ltd. and produced the documentary series The Reason I Live Here.

In 2020, he rose to fame for his hit documentary series titled Nanjing's Anti-epidemic Scene and Long Time No See, Wuhan that captured how regular Chinese responded to and recovered from the COVID-19 epidemic.

Personal life
Ryo Takeuchi is married to Zhao Ping. They have a son and a daughter.

Works

References

External links
 竹内亮twitter
 竹内亮Facebook
 竹内亮Weibo 
 和之夢YOUTUBE公式チャンネル
 和之夢公式ホームページ

1978 births
Living people
People from Abiko, Chiba
Nanjing University alumni
Japanese documentary film directors